"WTF (Where They From)" is a song by American rapper Missy Elliott, featuring fellow American rapper Pharrell Williams. Produced by the latter, it was released in 2015 as Elliott's first single and first music video, since 2008's "Shake Your Pom Pom", although she had been a featured artist on others' singles and videos and had released promotional singles, during the intervening years. The song received significant praise from critics, and was sometimes referred to as her "comeback".

"WTF" has not yet been released on an album, although it has been mentioned as a song for her long-awaited seventh album, which was first announced in 2008, and which at one point was to be named Block Party.

Background
Pick for a lead single of Elliott's seventh album stretches back as early 2008, when Elliott coined the soundtrack single "Ching-a-Ling" as a potential selection. However, by summer of that same year, Elliott decided against the idea and released the buzz record "Best, Best" instead. With "Best" servicing to minimal reaction nationwide, Elliott then entered recording sessions with recurring collaborator Pharrell Williams throughout the first quarter of 2009, as effort to produce a stronger radio single. The result was the Teyana Taylor-featured "Put It on Ya", which like its predecessor failed to gain commercial appeal; but managed to cite limited promo attention in European regions.

In 2012, in between both battling Graves' disease and contributing production for protégées Jazmine Sullivan and Sharaya J, Elliott returned to the making of her seventh album, and recruited childhood friend Timbaland to materialize the dual-promotional efforts "9th Inning" and "Triple Threat". While the songs met with lukewarm success on the digital charts, the releases failed to amass the proper impact needed to revive the "energy" of Elliott's seventh studio set. Elliott additionally had plans to release the Lil' Kim- and Eve-assisted "Murder She Wrote" as a follow-up single, however plans were ultimately shelved.

By late April 2014, reports surfaced of Elliott returning to the studio with Pharrell, in preparation of a potential collaboration. Further news circulated of the pair's work coming to light, when in April 2015, Pharrell alluded to Jimmy Fallon that new Elliott material was on the way and concluded that he "was so proud of her."

On October 26, 2015, Missy Elliott debuted a snippet of the Pharrell-produced cut "WTF" during an airing of Monday Night Football. Originally set for a release on November 13, "WTF" was released to digital outlets on November 12 at 9 a.m. EST, alongside the simultaneous release of its music video.

Composition
"WTF (Where They From)" is a futuristic up-tempo number that incorporates a "drum line esque" pattern and a trap backdrop. The song's entirety also features a female voice muttering the phrase "in person," which derives from Trayvon Martin's friend Rachel Jeantel, who uttered the wording in a 2013 interview with Huffpost Live.

Critical reception
"WTF (Where They From)" received widespread praise from music critics. Maeve McDermott form USA Today named it "Song of the Week" and wrote that "after becoming a household name with a decade of classic records before stepping back for the next ten-year stretch, Missy sounds triumphant on "WTF", serving her classic sing-song braggadocio and figure-praising lyrics alongside a guest appearance from Pharrell." The Guardian writer Lanre Bakare summed: "What it is a welcome bit of weird, fun pop that exists in its own pristine bubble. Get Ur Freak On." In his review for the Los Angeles Times, Gerrick D. Kennedy wrote that "the new jam is Missy at her best. The beat is as off-kilter and futuristically funky as could be expected from a track with her name on it, and the lyrics are a barrage of tongue-twisty, nonsensical punches". Spencer Kornhaber from The Atlantic found that "no one is as reliably able and willing to start a party as Missy [...] She’s not buying melodies from Swedish pop geniuses in attempts to conquer multiple radio formats; she’s not lugging around a Narrative. She’s pure rhythm + attitude, an equation for joy. So it is on “WTF,” with its earthquaking low end and catchiness-through-elongated-syllables. Pharrell, another rap-master of body music, shows up for a verse that fits nicely into the nonsensical tapestry." Pitchfork Media awarded the song with their "Best New Track" tag, praising Elliott's comeback, the track's production and lyrical criticism of cultural appropriation, and eventually naming the track the 30th best of 2015.

Alexa Camp, author for Slant magazine, wrote that the song "pairs Pharrell's paint-can beats with deep, sinuous 808s, and if the track lacks an obvious hook, it makes up for it with sheer swagger. Of course, Missy doesn't miss a beat, spitting rhymes like it's 2005." Similarly, MTV Newss Amanda Bell found that "the new Missy track is slick and stylish and all the things that made Missy slay back in the day (and now too, yay!)." Jon Blistein from Rolling Stone felt that "Elliott and Pharrell's [provide] infectious flows over the track's intergalactic production." The prestigious Village Voice named "WTF (Where They From)" the sixth-best single released in 2015 on their annual year-end critics' poll, Pazz & Jop.

Music video

Filming background

News of the video's formation first broke the air by TMZ in October 2015. The critically acclaimed "futuristic" visual features extensive directing control by Elliott's frequent collaborator Dave Meyers, alongside hyper-paced choreography by longtime friend Hi-Hat. Shooting locations included Downtown Los Angeles, Westlake, Los Angeles, Pershing Square (Los Angeles Metro station), and an "under-entrance" near Sixth Street Viaduct.

Synopsis
The Dave Meyers-directed piece opens with Downtown Los Angeles residents singing along to Elliott's "WTF" while going about their usual routines. The video then takes the viewers' attention to a glitzy-disco-cloaked Elliott dancing along an abandoned alleyway, before transitioning to rapid-paced choreography by Elliott and her background dancers. Elliott is then quickly shown rapping to the camera, where she begins to morph a cheetah-print tattoo from one side of her face to the other.

Moments later, a segment follows with Williams and Elliott as dancing marionettes rapping their verses. The remainder of the video then intercuts with Elliott and headlamp-sporting others dancing upon open boxes and moving hoverboards. Guest appearances throughout the visual's entirety comprises Les Twins and Missy Elliott's protégée Sharaya J.

Reception
Upon its release, the video received general acclaim from critics. The Guardian writer Lanre Bakare felt that "her first music video in seven years demonstrates that pop has missed Missy’s unique mix of street culture, futuristic imagery and off-kilter production." He summed it as "instantly recognizable [and] full of daft choreography". Additionally, less than 9 hours after its initial premiere, the video accumulated over 3 million views via YouTube.

Live performances
In Britney Spears' Britney: Piece of Me revamped Vegas residency show, "WTF (Where They From)" was performed as a medley along with other Elliott songs.

Charts

Weekly charts

Year-end charts

Certifications

Release history

References

External links

2015 singles
2015 songs
Missy Elliott songs
Music videos directed by Dave Meyers (director)
Song recordings produced by Pharrell Williams
Songs written by Missy Elliott
Atlantic Records singles
The Goldmind Inc. singles
Music videos featuring puppetry